The Itanhaém Formation is a geological formation of the Santos Basin offshore of the Brazilian states of Rio de Janeiro, São Paulo, Paraná and Santa Catarina. The formation is the reservoir rock of the Tambaú Field in the Santos Basin.

Etymology 
The formation is named after the town of Itanhaém, São Paulo.

Description 
These facies change laterally into the coarse clastics of the Florianópolis Formation. Facies analysis indicates a marine environment ranging from sub-littoral (inner neritic) and more rarely to pelagic (outer bathyal) conditions. The age based on planktonic foraminifera and pollen is Early Albian.

The formation is the reservoir rock of the Tambaú Field in the Santos Basin.

See also 

 Campos Basin

References

Bibliography 
 
 
  

Geologic formations of Brazil
Santos Basin
Cretaceous Brazil
Lower Cretaceous Series of South America
Albian Stage
Shale formations
Siltstone formations
Marl formations
Sandstone formations
Shallow marine deposits
Deep marine deposits
Reservoir rock formations
Petroleum in Brazil
Formations
Formations
Formations
Formations
Tupi–Guarani languages